Noel Campbell (11 December 1949 – 13 June 2022) was an Irish professional footballer who played as a midfielder.

Career
Born in Dublin, Campbell began his career in 1966 with St Patrick's Athletic F.C. in the League of Ireland where, alongside his brother Johnny, he played in the Inter-Cities Fairs Cup against Girondins de Bordeaux; with Noel scoring twice in the Stade Chaban-Delmas. He had played in the 1967 FAI Cup Final losing to Shamrock Rovers. He was the club's top scorer in 1968–69 and 1969–70.

While with St Patrick's he made his full international debut on 30 May 1971.

The following season Campbell moved to SC Fortuna Köln in Germany. From 1971 to 1973 he made 51 appearances and scored nine goals in the Regionalliga West; he also played five games and scored two goals in the promotion play-off to the Bundesliga. In 1973–74 he played 29 Bundesliga games and when he played against Borussia Mönchengladbach on 11 August 1973, he became the first Irishman to play in the Bundesliga. From 1974 to 1979 he scored 16 goals in 110 2. Bundesliga games.

Campbell won 11 caps for Ireland, one in his St Patrick's Athletic days and a further ten whilst under contract to Fortuna Köln (becoming, in 1972, the first Irishman to appear in the national colours whilst on the books of a club based in mainland Europe). He departed the international stage in somewhat ignominious circumstances, dismissed (rather arbitrarily, in the view of contemporary observers) within a minute of his introduction as a substitute in a 1977 World Cup qualifier against Bulgaria in Sofia.

Campbell made his debut for Shamrock Rovers on 3 December 1980 in a Leinster Senior Cup tie. He took over as assistant manager the following season to John Giles and then from February 1983 until May 1983 he was team manager.

He was the uncle of Dave Campbell.

Campbell died on 13 June 2022, aged 72.

References

External links
 Noel Campbell at fussballportal.de 
 

1949 births
2022 deaths
Association footballers from Dublin (city)
Republic of Ireland association footballers
Association football midfielders
Republic of Ireland international footballers
League of Ireland players
Bundesliga players
2. Bundesliga players
St Patrick's Athletic F.C. players
SC Fortuna Köln players
Shamrock Rovers F.C. players
Republic of Ireland football managers
League of Ireland managers
Shamrock Rovers F.C. managers
Republic of Ireland expatriate association footballers
Irish expatriate sportspeople in Germany
Expatriate footballers in Germany